The Wyoming Basin physiographic province is a geographic area through which the Continental Divide of the Americas traverses.  The province includes the Washakie Basin and Great Divide Basins, and is demarcated by the following:
 
southwest: Uinta Mountains
west: west side of Green River watershed

See also
 Wyoming Basin shrub steppe

References

Physiographic provinces
Geography of Carbon County, Wyoming
Geography of Fremont County, Wyoming
Geography of Sweetwater County, Wyoming
Geography of Wyoming